The first government headed by Arseniy Yatsenyuk was created in Ukraine on 27 February 2014 in the aftermath of the Revolution of Dignity. The cabinet was formed as a coalition of the Batkivschyna, UDAR and Svoboda political parties, the Economic Development and Sovereign European Ukraine parliamentary factions, and a number of unaffiliated MPs. On 24 July 2014, UDAR, Svoboda and 19 independent MPs exited the coalition to pave the way for the early parliamentary elections of late October 2014. Prime Minister Yatsenyuk announced his resignation the same day, but the Verkhovna Rada declined his resignation on 31 July 2014.

After the 26 October 2014 Ukrainian parliamentary election, the second Yatsenyuk government was formed.

Creation

The Yatsenyuk government took office in the wake of the anti-government Euromaidan protests that began in 2013 and culminated in the 21 February 2014 dismissal of President Viktor Yanukovych. The government was first presented at Kyiv's main Euromaidan protest camp at Maidan Nezalezhnosti on 26 February 2014. The government was then voted on by the Verkhovna Rada on 27 February 2014. There were no government posts for the UDAR party, led by one of the Euromaidan leaders, Vitali Klitschko. UDAR declined offers to participate in the new government.

On its first day 250 MPs joined the coalition, including Batkivshchyna, UDAR, Svoboda,  Economic Development and Sovereign European Ukraine.

Parliamentary voting
371 members of parliament voted to elect Arseniy Yatsenyuk as Prime Minister of Ukraine, only two votes short of the record-high 373 votes won by Yulia Tymoshenko in 2005.

Additional decisions

Changes in composition

Offices
On 1 March 2014, the Ministry of Revenues and Duties was liquidated. Its agencies were transferred to the Ministry of Finance. On 23 March 2014, the Ministry of Industrial Policy was merged with the Ministry of Economy and Trade.

Ministers
On 19 June 2014, First Vice Prime Minister Vitaly Yarema was appointed General Prosecutor of Ukraine. The same day, Pavlo Klimkin was appointed as Ukrainian foreign minister, replacing Andrii Deshchytsia.

On 2 September 2014, the Verkhovna Rada accepted the 21 August 2014 resignation of Pavlo Sheremeta, until then Minister of Economic Development and Trade.

July 2014 coalition collapse
On 24 July 2014, the coalition supporting the Yatsenyuk government collapsed after UDAR and Svoboda announced that they had left the coalition to pave the way for early parliamentary elections. UDAR faction leader Vitaliy Kovalchuk explained his party's actions with his observation that "the Verkhovna Rada is not set for constructive work in accordance with the will of the Ukrainian people". In addition, 15 independent deputies and eight Batkivschyna deputies also quit the coalition, soon followed by four more independent deputies. Prime Minister Arseniy Yatsenyuk announced his resignation in the late afternoon on 24 July 2014. During his announcement of resignation in parliament Yatsenyuk hinted that the coalition had collapsed because politicians did not want to be seen involved in making budget cuts and had thus placed "political interest above the fate of the country"; according to him, this was "a moral and an ethical crime". Yatsenyuk's resignation had to be officially accepted by the parliament and it did not do this the next day; parliament's next chance to accept his resignation would be at its following session on 31 July 2014.

UDAR faction leader Vitaliy Kovalchuk stated that since Yatsenyuk had not written a letter of resignation ("and in accordance with the Constitution, Yatsenyuk had to file the verbal statement"), parliament could not accept his resignation; Kovalchuk argued that hence Yatsenyuk was still Prime Minister. Nevertheless, (also on 25 June 2014) the Yatsenyuk government appointed Deputy Prime Minister of Ukraine for Regional Policy – Minister of Regional Development, Construction and Housing and Communal Services of Ukraine Volodymyr Groysman as its acting Prime Minister. In the evening of 25 July, the parliamentary press service stated that the body had "received the statement of the Prime Minister of Ukraine of his resignation". The Verkhovna Rada declined his resignation on 31 July 2014, with only 16 out of 450 MPs voted for his resignation.

Policy
In early August 2014, the Yatsenyuk government introduced draft tax reform legislation that would reduce the number of taxes and fees from 22 to 9.

The government stated that it did not intend to make Ukraine a member of NATO.

The government drew criticism over the repeal of a law that protected the official use of the Russian language in Ukraine.

Composition

On 12 November 2014, the ministers of Svoboda resigned and became acting ministers until the formation of a new government.

International response

A majority of the west recognized the government, including German Chancellor Angela Merkel, Prime Minister of Latvia Laimdota Straujuma, President of Belarus Alexander Lukashenko, and Prime Minister of Lithuania Algirdas Butkevičius. On 27 February 2014, U.S. Vice President Joe Biden told Yatsenyuk that his interim government had the full support of the United States.

A few days later, the United States Secretary of State John Kerry visited the Ukrainian capital of Kyiv on 4 March 2014 and met with Yatsenyuk. He was followed by members of the European Union, who met with members of his government prior to a EU summit on 6 March 2014.

Russia, however, denounced the events that led to the previous government's ouster as an illegitimate coup and considered the Yatsenyuk government illegitimate.

Notes

References

External links
 Governmental Portal of Ukraine – official site of the Cabinet of Ministers

2014 establishments in Ukraine
Cabinets established in 2014
Ukrainian governments
Euromaidan
Yatsenyuk
2014 disestablishments in Ukraine
Cabinets disestablished in 2014